Prod or PROD may refer to:
Cattle prod, a device used to goad livestock into moving
Public Request to Order Disposal, part of the Local Government, Planning and Land Act 1980
 Prod, a village in Hoghilag Commune, Sibiu County, Romania
Product integral, often shown using the symbol 
 "Prod", a song by Mudvayne from L.D. 50
Prod, the bow or spring part of a crossbow
Prod., an abbreviation of production (disambiguation)
Prod, a derogatory abbreviation for a Protestant person in Northern Ireland